Austen Fox Riggs (December 12, 1876 – March 5, 1940) was an American psychiatrist and pioneering researcher in stress response. In 1913, he founded the Austen Riggs Center, a psychiatric treatment facility in Stockbridge, Massachusetts.

Biography
Austen Fox Riggs was born on December 12, 1876 in Kassel, Germany to American parents, Benjamin C. Riggs and Rebecca (Fox) Riggs. He attended Harvard University and received his Bachelor of Arts degree in 1898. He then attended the Columbia University College of Physicians and Surgeons to receive his M.D. in 1902. He completed further post-graduate work at Johns Hopkins School of Medicine in 1904.

In 1907, Riggs was recovering from tuberculosis at his Stockbridge, Massachusetts home when he began furthering his understanding of psychiatry and psychology. In 1913, he established the Stockbridge Institute for the Study and Treatment of Psychoneuroses, a mental health facility for voluntary admittance patients. In 1919, it was renamed to the Austen Riggs Foundation, and today is known as the Austen Riggs Center. Riggs served as its president and medical director until his death in 1940 due to illness.

Publications
 Talks to patients, I–III (1916)
 Just Nerves (1922) – with introduction by Henry Van Dyke
 Intelligent Living (1929)
 Play: Recreation in a Balanced Life (1935)

Personal life
In April 1904, Riggs married Alice McBurney Riggs, and they had three daughters and a son together. She died in 1970.

References

External links

 History of the Austen Riggs Center

1876 births
1940 deaths
American psychiatrists
Columbia University Vagelos College of Physicians and Surgeons alumni
Harvard College alumni
Austen Riggs Center physicians
Expatriates from the United States in the German Empire